ZDFkultur (stylized as zdf.kultur) was a German free-to-air television channel owned by ZDF. It was launched on 7 May 2011, replacing ZDF theaterkanal. It mainly broadcast music shows, such as Later... with Jools Holland, pop concerts and series from the ZDF archive, but also movies and theatre plays. On 1 May 2012, a high-definition simulcast was launched on satellite. On 22 February 2013, ZDF director Thomas Bellut announced that ZDFkultur would close in the near future, due to cost-saving measures at ZDF. The channel council agreed Bellut's proposal on 8 March 2013. The programming after the closure announcement consisting mostly of old ZDF archive content from the 1970s and 80s, with an annual budget of around €2 million. The channel was finally closed down on 30 September 2016.

Audience share

References

External links
  

Publicly funded broadcasters
Defunct television channels in Germany
Television channels and stations established in 2011
Television channels and stations disestablished in 2016
2011 establishments in Germany
2016 disestablishments in Germany
Mass media in Mainz
ZDF